Roane County is a county of the U.S. state of Tennessee. As of the  2020 census, the population was 53,404. Its county seat is Kingston. Roane County is included in the Knoxville, TN Metropolitan Statistical Area.

History

Roane County was formed in 1801, and named for Archibald Roane, the second Governor of Tennessee.  Upon the creation of the Southwest Territory in 1790, the territory's governor, William Blount, initially wanted to locate the territorial capital at the mouth of the Clinch River, but was unable to obtain title to the land from the Cherokee.  Kingston, Roane's county seat, is rooted in Fort Southwest Point, a frontier fort constructed in the early 1790s.

During the Civil War, Roane County, like many East Tennessee counties, was largely pro-Union. When Tennessee voted on the Ordinance of Secession on June 8, 1861, Roane Countians voted 1,568 to 454 in favor of remaining in the Union.  In October 1861, Union guerrilla William B. Carter organized the East Tennessee bridge-burning conspiracy from a command post in Kingston.  During the Knoxville Campaign in December 1863, a Union force led by General James G. Spears scattered a small Confederate force led by John R. Hart near Kingston.

In the years following the Civil War, Rockwood grew into a major iron and coal mining center with the establishment of the Roane Iron Company by General John T. Wilder.  Iron ore and coal were mined on Walden Ridge and shipped to Rockwood, where the ore was converted into pig iron.  The pig iron was then shipped to rolling mills in Knoxville or Chattanooga.

During the late 19th century, northern investors established two planned cities in Roane County— Cardiff and Harriman.  Cardiff, located northeast of Rockwood, was planned as a company town to support several proposed mining industries in the area.  Harriman was planned as a Temperance Town.  Both ventures suffered critical setbacks as a result of the Panic of 1893.  Harriman survived, but never grew in the manner its planners had envisioned, while Cardiff failed altogether.  During World War II, the federal government created the city of Oak Ridge as a planned community as part of the Manhattan Project to develop the atomic bomb.  As a result of the Project, both the K-25 gaseous diffusion plant and the Oak Ridge National Laboratory are located in the county.

Geography

Three rivers— the Tennessee River, the Clinch River, and the Emory River— pass through Roane County. The Emory empties into the Clinch near Kingston, and the Clinch empties into the Tennessee just downstream from Kingston. The rivers in Roane are mostly part of Watts Bar Lake.

Roane County straddles the geographical boundary between the Tennessee Valley and the Cumberland Plateau, with the latter's Walden Ridge escarpment visible from much of the county.

Adjacent counties

Morgan County (north)
Anderson County (northeast)
Knox County (east)
Loudon County (southeast)
McMinn County (south)
Meigs County (southwest)
Rhea County (southwest)
Cumberland County (west/CST Border)

State protected areas
Campbell Bend Barrens State Natural Area
Crowder Cemetery State Natural Area
Kingston Refuge
McGlothin-Largen Wildlife Management Area
Mount Roosevelt Wildlife Management Area (part)
Paint Rock Refuge
Watts Bar Wildlife Management Area

Demographics

2020 census

As of the 2020 United States census, there were 53,404 people, 20,901 households, and 13,948 families residing in the county.

2010 census
As of the census of 2010, there were 54,181 people, 22,376 households, and 15,450 families residing in the county. The population density was 150 people per square mile (59/km2). There were 25,716 housing units at an average density of 71 per square mile (28/km2). The racial makeup of the county was 94.4% White, 2.7% Black or African American, 0.3% Native American, 0.5% Asian, 0.0003% Pacific Islander, 0.17% from other races, and 1.6% from two or more races. 1.3% of the population were Hispanic or Latino of any race.

There were 22,376 households, out of which 23.9% had children under the age of 18 living with them, 53.8% were married couples living together, 10.9% had a female householder with no husband present, and 31% were non-families. 26.9% of all households were made up of individuals, and 12.2% had someone living alone who was 65 years of age or older. The average household size was 2.39 and the average family size was 2.88.

In the county, the population was spread out, with 20.8% under the age of 18 and 18.6% who were 65 years of age or older. The median age was 44.9 years. For every 100 females there were 96.6 males. For every 100 females age 18 and over, there were 92.85 males.

As of the census of 2000, the median income for a household in the county was $33,226, and the median income for a family was $41,399. Males had a median income of $32,204 versus $22,439 for females. The per capita income for the county was $18,456. About 10.30% of families and 13.90% of the population were below the poverty line, including 18.80% of those under age 18 and 13.80% of those age 65 or over.

The Census Bureau has defined the Harriman-Kingston-Rockwood area as a contiguous urban cluster.

Media
Several movies have been filmed in Roane County, including Boys of Summerville, That Evening Sun and October Sky. Roane County was the childhood home of actress Megan Fox, who lived in Kingston. She attended elementary school, took dance classes, and was on the swim team in Roane County. The 2010 film, Get Low, starring Bill Murray, Robert Duvall, and Sissy Spacek, was based on the true story of a Roane County man, Felix Breazeale. Breazeale was a local hermit who opted to throw himself a funeral while he was still alive. The funeral intrigued many, making it a gathering of thousands. Roane County has produced thousands of successful athletes. One of Roane County's most recent athletes is Tyler Thompson of Kingston. Thompson played Division I basketball in the Ohio Valley Conference for Tennessee Technological University.

Communities

Cities
Harriman (small part in Morgan County)
Kingston (county seat)
Oak Ridge (partial)
Rockwood

Town
Oliver Springs (partial)

Census-designated place
Midtown

Unincorporated communities
 Blair
Cave Creek
 Cedar Grove
 Midway
 Ten Mile (partial)
 Postoak

Former communities
 Cardiff
 Wheat

Politics

See also
 National Register of Historic Places listings in Roane County, Tennessee

References

External links

 Official site
 
 Roane County News - Twice-weekly community newspaper covering Harriman, Kingston, Oliver Springs, Rockwood and Roane County, Tennessee
 The Roane Alliance - Roane County's umbrella economic development organization over both public and private organizations, including the Roane County Chamber of Commerce and others, each with a separate board and budget.
 Roane County Tennessee Family History Project - Provides scans and searchable transcriptions of old documents and books relating to history and genealogy of past or present Roane County families.
 Roane County, TNGenWeb - free genealogy resources for the county

 
1801 establishments in Tennessee
Populated places established in 1801
Counties of Appalachia
Second Amendment sanctuaries in Tennessee
East Tennessee